The Saint, the Surfer, and the CEO: A Remarkable Story About Living Your Heart's Desires is a motivational book by Robin Sharma.

Background.
In this work, the author, through the book hero Jack Valentine, exemplifies "how to access your inner gifts and reshape your whole outer life in the process". Jack Valentine is a chronically unhappy, broke and under-performing man, who has broken up with his girlfriend and has just met with an accident. He wakes up in a hospital, covered in bruises, and meets his long-lost father, who is his dying roommate. As he recovers from his injuries, Jack receives some final advice from his father, consisting of three questions on whether one has lived wisely, served greatly or loved well. Soon, Jack is sent on a journey across the world where he meets three teachers: a saint, a surfer and a CEO who help him find the answer to the three questions.

References

External links
 Official website
 The Saint, the Surfer, and the CEO: A Remarkable Story About Living Your Heart's Desires on GoodReads

2003 non-fiction books
Leadership
Self-help books
Hay House books